Gary Simmons may refer to:
 Gary Simmons (ice hockey)
 Gary Simmons (artist)
 Gary Simmons (politician)